Microsoft Commerce Server is a Microsoft product for building e-commerce systems using Microsoft .NET technology.

History
In 1996, Microsoft purchased the core software that formed the basis for the Commerce Server product line from eShop. eShop was co-founded by Pierre Omidyar, one of the founders of eBay.

In 1997, the software was rebranded to Microsoft Merchant Server, then Microsoft Site Server, eventually being renamed to Microsoft Commerce Server in 2000.
 
Initially released in 2000, Commerce Server replaced Microsoft Site Server, expanding on the functionality and establishing a focus on e-commerce functionality (rather than concerning itself with document management or content metadata). It helped to create an e-commerce solution or web site with high-performance, familiar tools designed to simplify setup, management, and administration tasks.

The last version of the Microsoft-developed product is Microsoft Commerce Server 2009 R2. Microsoft continued to honor extended support of Commerce Server 2009 through 2019.  Sitecore now takes responsibility for developing, selling, and supporting the Commerce Server product. The latest release is Sitecore Commerce Server 11, released in 2014.

History in the UK
Used extensively by a number of middle to large UK retailers, Commerce Server gained considerable traction in the early 2000s.  Primarily implemented by Microsoft Partners, the following were sites that at one point were running on a Commerce Server foundation:

1990s:
 England Direct 
 England Cricket Board
 Manchester United
 West Indies Cricket Board

2000 - 2010
 Alba
 Betterware
 Blackburn Rovers FC
 Blacks
 Blooming Marvellous
 Bravissomo
 Carl Lewis
 Cath Kidston
 Charles Tyrwhitt Shirts
 Choices
 Clarks
 Cross
 Dobbies
 Dreams
 Eyestorm
 French Connection
 GAME
 Graham and Green
 Great Plains
 Hawkin's Bazaar
 Hawkshead
 Lakeland
 Leicester FC
 Levi's
 Links of London
 Lipsy
 Liverpool FC
 LK Bennett
 Long Tall Sally
 MacCulloch & Wallis
 Maclaren Pushchairs
 Majestic
 MFI
 Millets
 New Look
 Newcastle FC
 Nicole Farhi
 Oddbins
 Ordnance Survey
 Oxfam
 Pearson Publishing
 Pets at Home
 Punch Taverns
 Racing Green
 Rangers FC
 Rohan
 Route One
 Scotts of Stow
 Soletraders
 St Andrews
 Suit Direct
 The White Company
TM Lewin
 Toast
 Toys R Us

2010 - onwards
 Best Buy (UK)
 Co-op Electrical
 Co-op Pharmacy
 Exp Workwear
 WHSmith

UK Microsoft Commerce Server Implementors 
The following companies were responsible for the vast majority of Microsoft Commerce led ecommerce implementation.

 Conchango - Conchango was bought by EMC in 2008 and rebranded in 2009 to become EMC Consulting
 e-in-business - The team behind eibDIGITAL moved over to Welcome Digital in 2014.
 Maginus
 Snowvalley - Snow Valley - now part of MICROS
 Screen Pages
 TCPL

Components

System components
Commerce Server 2009, which became available on Microsoft's price list on 1 April 2009, introduced multichannel awareness into the product, a new default site (running in Microsoft's SharePoint product), including 30 new web parts and controls, and WYSIWYG (what-you-see-is-what-you-get) editing experiences for business people and site designers.

These features were introduced through the new Commerce Foundation  - an abstraction layer that unifies calling patterns of the core systems (see below) and allows for different presentation and business logic to be easily added and represented as 'selling channels'; and SharePoint Commerce Services which includes integration with Microsoft SharePoint - a new default site with 30 new web parts and controls pre-assembled.  The default site can be skinned through the new page templating technology, allowing for individual pages to be easily changed by selecting a different template.

The product still retains its core systems of Catalog, Inventory, Orders, Profiles, and Marketing.

Other components
The server comes bundled with Data Warehouse Analytics, which offer sophisticated reporting functionality, dependent on the availability of Microsoft SQL Server Analytics module, in addition to the Commerce Server Staging (CSS) system. The Staging functionality automates the deployment of both dynamic and active content across a network infrastructure and can accommodate a wide variety of network configurations. (Some have remarked that the speed of CSS deployments is perhaps the most note-worthy aspect of this component.) Commerce Server also comes with BizTalk adaptors, which allow for integration with Microsoft BizTalk for enterprise data manipulation.

Related technologies
The product requires the presence of Microsoft SQL Server 2005 or later.  Commerce Server also can leverage a number of other Microsoft server products, including BizTalk Server 2006, R2, or 2009 and Microsoft Office SharePoint Server (MOSS).

.NET Framework 3.5 and Microsoft's Component Object Model (COM) are also required, as the other components used by this product are dependent on these technologies.  Recommended deployments are confined to Windows Server 2003 or higher.

Microsoft release history
 2000 - Commerce Server 2000
 2002 - Commerce Server 2002
 Service Pack 2 (2003)
 Service Pack 3 (2004)
 2004 - Commerce Server 2002 FP1
 Service Pack 4 (2006)
 2006 - Commerce Server 2007
 Service Pack 1 (2007)
 Service Pack 2 (2008)
 2009 - Commerce Server 2009
 2011 - Commerce Server 2009 R2
2013 - Service Pack 1

post-Microsoft Release History
July 2012 - Ascentium Commerce Server 2009
July 2012 - Ascentium Commerce Server 2009 R2
December 2012 - CommerceServer.net Commerce Server 10.0
May 2013 - CommerceServer.net Commerce Server 10.1
May 2013 - Ascentium Commerce Server 2009 R2 Service Pack 1
August 2014 - Sitecore Commerce Server 11.0
October 2014 - Sitecore Commerce Server 11.1

Future development
The Microsoft Commerce Server business was outsourced to Cactus Commerce (Gatineau, Quebec, Canada) in 2007.  After Ascentium purchased Cactus Commerce along with the Microsoft Commerce Server business in 2011, they rebranded the software to Ascentium Commerce Server.

Ascentium later rebranded itself as SMITH and split off the Commerce Server product division into a subsidiary known as CommerceServer.net.

In November 2013, Sitecore acquired CommerceServer.net.

In August 2014, Sitecore released Sitecore Commerce Server 11.

See also
 Microsoft Servers
 Sitecore Commerce Server

References

External links
 Sitecore Commerce Server Experts LinkedIn Group

Commerce Server